Funeral Sky is the debut album of the indie folk band Reuben and the Dark, though the lead vocalist Reuben Bullock had released two solo albums preceding this with members of the same band.

The song Black Water, was later used in the trailer for 2019 film El Camino: A Breaking Bad Movie.

Production
The recording of the album came about because Reuben Bullock, the singer and guitarist of the band, happened to meet Christopher Hayden in Mexico whilst on vacation. This led to some sessions in Mexico followed by more in Canada, before Stephen Kozmeniuk was brought in to record more tracks.

Critical reception
Zachary Houle, writing for Popmatters, gave the album six stars out of ten, and whilst he liked the debut, he had reservations about some of the tracks. "Funeral Sky is a engaging listen, even if it doesn’t fire on all cylinders as one would like. The folksiness of the album is enjoyable, and even when the record stumbles, there’s something of interest to have for the listener." Matt Bobkin, writing in Exclaim!, had  similar sentiments to Houle, stating; "The band's identity oscillates between pop craftsmen and languid folkies, with the album at its best when they hit that sweet spot in the middle. Funeral Sky is a decent debut, but the band definitely sounds like they have potential for something greater."

During the 2015 Canadian federal election campaign, it was revealed that Funeral Sky was one of the albums that Justin Trudeau was listening to on the campaign trail.

Track listing

References

External links
Arts & Crafts webpage on Funeral Sky

2014 debut albums
Reuben and the Dark albums